The Tea Horse Road or Chamadao, now generally referred to as the Ancient Tea Horse Road or Chamagudao was a network of caravan paths winding through the mountains of Sichuan, Yunnan and Tibet in Southwest China. This was also a tea trade route. It is also sometimes referred to as the Southern Silk Road or Southwest Silk Road.

There are numerous surviving archaeological and monumental elements, including trails, bridges, way stations, market towns, palaces, staging posts, shrines and temples along the route.

"Ancient Tea Horse Road" is a historical concept with a specific meaning. It refers to a major traffic road formed by the exchange of tea horses between Han and Tibet from the Tang and Song Dynasties to the Republic of China.

Road classification

Shaanxi-Gansu Tea Horse Road (陕甘茶马古道)
Shaanxi-Gansu Tea Horse Road is the main road for tea in mainland China to travel west and exchange for horses. It is one of the main routes of the ancient Silk Road.

Tanggu Road (蹚古道)
Beginning in the Han dynasty, it was formed by Shaanxi merchants and the ancient tea-horse market in the southwest frontier. Since the government of the Ming and Qing dynasties imposed government control on tea sales, tea sales were divided into regions, and the most prosperous tea and horse trading market was in Kangding.

Yunnan-Tibet Tea Horse Road (滇藏茶马古道)
It was formed in the late sixth century AD. It started from Yiwu and Pu'er in Xishuangbanna, the main tea producing area of Yunnan, and entered Tibet through today's Dali Bai Autonomous Prefecture, Lijiang City and Shangri-La, and went directly to Lhasa. Some were also re-exported from Tibet to India and Nepal, which was an important trade route between ancient China and South Asia.

Sichuan-Tibet Tea Horse Road (川藏茶马古道)
The Ancient Sichuan-Tibet Tea-Horse Road is a part of the Shaanxi-Kangding-Tibet Tea-Horse Road. It starts from Ya'an, the tea producing area of Yazhou in the east, passes through Dajian Furnace (now Kangding), reaches Lhasa, Tibet in the west, and finally leads to Bhutan, Nepal and India. More than a thousand kilometres, it is an indispensable bridge and link between ancient Tibet and the mainland.

History

Sichuan and Yunnan are believed to be the first tea-producing regions in the world. The first records of tea cultivation suggest that tea was cultivated on Sichuan's Mount Mengding (蒙顶山) between Chengdu and Ya'an earlier than 65 BC. Ya'an has been an important hub of tea trading till the 20th century.

From around a thousand years ago, the Tea Horse Road become a trade link from Yunnan to Tibet; and to Central China via Sichuan Province.  It is believed that it was through this trading network that tea (typically tea bricks) first spread across China and Asia from its origins in Pu'er county in Yunnan. The route earned the name because of the common trade of Tibetan ponies for Chinese tea, a practice dating back at least to the Song dynasty, when the sturdy horses were important for China to fight warring nomads in the north.

Both people and horses carried heavy loads. Tea porters sometimes carried over 60–90 kg (132-198 lb.), which was often more than their own body weight in tea. Porters were equipped with metal-tipped staffs, both for balance while walking and to help support the load while they rested, so they didn't need to lay the bales down (as illustrated in the photo).

In addition to tea, the mule caravans carried salt and silk products from Chengdu, notably Shujin (蜀锦)..

Historic Site
The Ancient Tea Horse Road is a complex network of roads, of which some of the ancient tea horse roads and related historical sites in Sichuan, Yunnan and Guizhou provinces were listed as the seventh batch of China National Key Cultural Relics Protection Units on 5 March 2013. There are numerous cultural heritage sites listed as National Key Cultural Heritage Protection Units, including ancient road sites, post stations, shops, pagodas, bridges and piers, as well as related guild buildings, religious buildings, mining and metallurgical sites and kiln sites, cliff carvings and inscriptions in the ancient tea horse road network.

In Sichuan
The Ancient Tea Horse Road in Sichuan.

In Yunnan
There are 86 cultural heritage sites on the ancient tea horse route in Yunnan province, located in 21 counties and cities。

In Guizhou

Historical value

The ruins of Guangen Bridge
The site of Guangen Bridge is located in Minjiang Village, Zhen Yuan County and Enle Old Street river bank, built in the early Qing dynasty, the bridge is 188 meters long, with stone piers and wooden frames, and more than 50 tiled houses on both sides. Qing Yongzheng five years (1727) flooding washed away, the Qing dynasty Yongzheng eight years (1730) and the Qing dynasty Daoguang three years (1823), the county Tan on the restoration of the wide grace bridge.

Qing dynasty Daoguang six years (1826), the county Zhang Zhao additional repaired the Guangen Bridge. Qing dynasty Tongzhi's first year (1862), this bridge was burned again.

In the middle of the Republic of China, repaired into a stone pier wooden surface bridge. Early liberation of China, the bridge was washed away by the river, now only four stone piers, the rest were covered by the river bank sediment, stone pier part in 1973 to build the Enable Bridge with stone was demolished. Now the west bank pier is 4.2 meters high, 12.6 meters wide, and 9.7 meters long, complete preservation.

Bunakuo
"Bunakuo" is the translation of the Naxi language, Chinese means "artemisia plain", because of the wild artemisia growing everywhere and the name, as known as "Guangle village". The administrative area belongs to Jinan Town of Gucheng District, which was the largest market town on the eastern route of the ancient tea horse road in ancient times, and is rich in cultural relics, natural landscapes, ethnic culture and other tourism resources. The natural scenery of Leidashan Mountain, the culture of Guzong created by the Tibetan descendants of the Guzong people who migrated from Yanjing in Tibet, and the local Naxi Dongba culture are intertwined here.

Safeguard procedures
On March 5, 2013, the Tea Horse Ancient Road was announced by The State Council of the People's Republic of China as the seventh batch of national key cultural relic protection units.

Future
In the 21st century, the legacy of the Tea-Horse Road has been used to promote a railway that will connect Chengdu to Lhasa. This planned railroad, part of the PRC's 13th 5-Year Plan, is called the Sichuan-Tibet railway (川藏铁路); it will connect cities across the route including Kangding. Authorities claim it will bring great benefit to the people's welfare.

Gallery

See also 
 Tea
 Pu'er tea
 Mengding Ganlu tea
 Shaxi, Yunnan, a well-preserved historical trading town in Jianchuan County on the ancient tea route
 Siberian Route
 Silk Road
 Jeff Fuchs,  the first westerner to walk the entire road

References

Further reading
 Forbes, Andrew ; Henley, David (2011). China's Ancient Tea Horse Road. Chiang Mai: Cognoscenti Books. 
 Forbes, Andrew ; Henley, David (2011). Traders of the Golden Triangle. Chiang Mai: Cognoscenti Books.

External links 

 Documentary: Insight on Asia - Asian Corridor in Heaven - Made by KBS. TV Program.
 Tea Horse Road - National Geographic Magazine
 "The Tea Horse Road", Jeff Fuchs, The Silk Road, Vol.6, No.1 (Winter 2008).
 Interview: Jeff Fuchs, Gokunming, August 11, 2010.
 Bob Rogers and Claire Rogers, "Traveling Today's Tea Horse Road", Desert Leaf magazine, February 2011.

Trade routes
Silk Road
Geography of Yunnan
History of Yunnan
History of Tibet
Medieval roads and tracks
Major National Historical and Cultural Sites in Yunnan
Horse trade
Historic trails and roads in India
Horses in China